Embassy of Estonia in London is the diplomatic mission of Estonia in the United Kingdom. It is located at 44 Queen's Gate Terrace. The new building of the Estonian Embassy in London at Queen's Gate Terrace was opened on 14 October 2015 by Estonian Foreign Minister Marina Kaljurand. Former Embassy building at 16 Hyde Park Gate is now Ambassador's residence.

References

External links
 

Diplomatic missions in London
London
Estonia–United Kingdom relations
Buildings and structures in the Royal Borough of Kensington and Chelsea
South Kensington